Tale of a True Man  is a Soviet feature film directed by Aleksandr Stolper, shot on the same name book by Boris Polevoy.

For the participation in the film, a number of film actors and the cameraman were awarded the Stalin Prize in 1949.

Plot
At the heart of the dramatic history are the real facts of the biography of the fighter pilot Alexey Maresyev. Shot in battle over the occupied territory, he for three weeks made his way through the snow-covered forests until he got to the partisans. Having lost both legs, the hero subsequently shows an amazing strength of character, again sits at the helm of the aircraft and replenishes the account of air victories over the enemy.

Cast
 Pavel Kadochnikov as Alexey Maresyev
 Nikolay Okhlopkov as commissar Vorobiev
 Aleksei Dikiy as Vasily Vasilyevich
 Vasili Merkuryev as  Stepan Ivanovich the foreman
 Tamara Makarova as  Klavdia Mikhailovna
 Lyudmila Tselikovskaya as  Zinochka
 Lev Sverdlin as  Naumov
Czeslaw Sushkevich as Kukushkin
 Viktor Khokhryakov as   Degtyarenko
 Aleksandr  Mikhailov as  Petrov
 Boris Dobronravov as   chairman of the commission
 Boris Babochkin as   commander of the regiment
 Lyubov Sokolova as   collective farmer Varvara (debut role)
 Sergei Bondarchuk as   Gvozdev
 Mikhail Gluzsky as    captain Cheslov
  Vladimir Gribkov  as   Zuyev
 Ivan Ryzhov as    patient in the sanatorium

Awards
Stalin Prize
Aleksandr Stolper (director) 
Mark Magidson (cinematographer) 
Pavel Kadochnikov (actor) 
Vasili Merkuryev (actor) 
Nikolay Okhlopkov  (actor)

See also
 List of World War II films

References

External links
 
 Повесть о настоящем человеке on RusKino

Mosfilm films
Films about aviators
Soviet black-and-white films
Soviet drama films
1948 drama films
1948 films
Eastern Front of World War II films